Philip Edward Moran (born March 6, 1961) is an American politician. A member of the Republican Party, he was elected to the Mississippi State Senate in 2011. He lives in Kiln, Mississippi with his wife, Sheila.

References

External links

Republican Party Mississippi state senators
1961 births
Living people
21st-century American politicians